The Campau family of Detroit, Michigan, was established when brothers Michel and Jacques Campau settled in Detroit, Michigan in 1707 and 1708, respectively. Jacques, Joseph Campau, and Barnabé Campau are among the Barons of Detroit, according to Richard R. Elliott, because they had "ancestral virtues most worthily perpetuated."

Joseph; Louis Sr.; Louis Jr.; and Barnabas Campau were fur traders, first selling their furs in Canada and then New York. Joseph was a merchant in Detroit and several trading posts and the others operated a number of trading posts in "Indian country". They were also involved in treaties between the Native Americans and the federal government, which were very lucrative endeavors. Joseph made millions as real estate promoter and was a civil servant for Detroit. Other family members established trading posts in places that came to be known as Manlius (1825), Eaton Rapids, Muskegon, Manistee, Lowell, and Hastings. George established a trading post at Maple Rapids. Louis Campau Jr. established trading posts at Saginaw (1816) and Grand Rapids (1826).

The descendants of Jacques and Michel, the 18th-century settlers of Detroit, were located in three cities: Detroit, Grand Rapids, and Chicago by the 20th century.

The coat of arms for the Campau family shows that they descended from a Baron of the Middle Ages. The surname is sometimes spelled "Campeau".

First generation

Michel and Jacques Campau

Antoine de la Mothe Cadillac founded Fort Pontchartrain du Détroit in 1701 and sold 68 land grants between 1707 and 1710, two of which were sold to the Campau brothers. Michel Chapau left Montreal and settled at Fort Pontchartrain du Détroit on August 3, 1707. He lived at the settlement with his wife, Jeanne Maas, and worked as a farmer. The couple had daughters named Jeanne and Marguerite (b. 1708) and a son, Paul Alexander (b. 1709). Michel died before 1740.

On September 3, 1708, Jacques Campau (1677–1751) settled in Detroit. He was a blacksmith. Jacques and his wife Cecile Catlin had a son, Louis (1702–1744). Jacques was buried on May 14, 1751. Many of their descendants are buried at Elmwood Cemetery in Detroit.

The brothers parents were Etienne Campau and Catherine Paulo of Montreal. Their descendants were located by the 20th century in three cities: Detroit, Grand Rapids, and Chicago.

Third generation

Joseph Campau

Jacques' great-grandson, Joseph Campau (February 2, 1769 – July 23, 1863)
 was among Detroit's leading citizens and wealthiest landowners at the dawn of the 19th century. Joseph was the state's first millionaire. He made millions in the real-estate industry and served in several public offices for the city. Campau held multiple public office positions in Detroit. He was City Trustee in 1802, City Treasurer, City Inspector of water barrels and City Assessor, appraiser, and over-seer of the poor. In 1802, he was an original trustee of Detroit and its incorporation. His daughter Catherine married Francis Palms, the largest landowner in Michigan during the mid-1850s.

Cecile Campeau

Jacques' great-granddaughter and Joseph's sister, Marie-Cecile (Cecile) Campeau, was married to Thomas Williams by Arent DePeyster, commandant of Fort Detroit on May 7, 1781. It was one of Detroit's early Protestant marriages. Her father was Jacques Chapeau and her brothers were Barnabas, Denis, Joseph, Louis, Nicolas and Toussaint Chapeau. Williams was a trader and licensed merchant, justice of the peace, and notary. Cecile and Thomas had three children: Catherine, Elizabeth, and John Elizabeth taught in a Catholic school that she co-founded under the auspices of Gabriel Richard, a Detroit priest. John R. Williams was the first mayor of Detroit. The Williams family remained in Detroit from that time. Thomas Williams died on November 30, 1785, and in July 1790, Cecile married Jaques Leson (also spelled Loson and Lauson) and they lived in what is now St. Clair County, Michigan. They had a daughter, Angelique. Cecile died on June 24, 1805, and was buried in the St. Anne's church cemetery.

Third and/or fourth generation

Pierre Michel Campau
Pierre Michel Campau was the first white settler in Southgate, Michigan. He moved into the area in 1795, which subsequently became a farming community. Other people from the Detroit area at the Rouge and Detroit Rivers followed him to Southgate.

Louis Campau

Louis Campau (August 11, 1791 – April 13, 1871), sometimes spelled Campeau, was son of Louis Campau Sr. He began working the fur trade as a boy for his father and his uncle, Joseph Campau. During the War of 1812, he served under the United States Army. Campau was an important figure in the early settlement of two important Michigan cities. He established the first trading post at what is today Saginaw, Michigan, as early as 1815. He played a key role in negotiating the Treaty of Saginaw in 1819 between Gen. Lewis Cass and Native American tribes of the Great Lakes region in which Native Americans ceded more than six million acres (24,000 km²) in the central portion of the Lower Peninsula of the state.

In 1826, Campau moved westward and established a trading post in what is today Grand Rapids. In 1831, he bought land for what is now the downtown business district of that city from the federal government for $90. Along with fellow pioneer Lucius Lyon, Campau is remembered as one of the founding fathers of Grand Rapids.

Antoine Campau
Antoine Campau, like his brother of Louis, was a fur trader. Between 1815 and 1816, he was at the Saginaw trading post.

According to James M. McClurken, Antoine has been believed to be the father of Odawa chief Cobmoosa, who first lived near Grand Rapids, Michigan. Cobmoosa led the Ojibwe, of a band of the Ottawa people, in Ionia, Michigan, and sold their crops to the initial settlers of Ionia in 1833. He was also among those who went with Rix Robinson to negotiate a treaty for removal to Indian Territory, but he like other Ojibwe resisted that removal. In 1855 he signed a treaty with the federal government to relocate to Oceana County, Michigan, in exchange for $540,000 in cash and goods. The government built a log cabin for him in Cobmoosa, Michigan, and he along with 1300 others relocated by 1858.

Other

Charles Columbus "Count" Campau

Charles Columbus "Count" Campau (October 17, 1863 – April 3, 1938) was a professional baseball player whose career spanned the years 1885 to 1905. He played for the Detroit Wolverines, St. Louis Browns, and Washington Senators in July 1894. He was the American Association's home run leader in 1890 and was also the Browns' manager for 41 games that season. Campau was also a manager in minor league baseball for 19 years, including stints with the New Orleans Pelicans, Kansas City Blues, Detroit Tigers/Wolverines, Seattle Yannigans/Rainmakers, Grand Rapids Bob-o-links, Rochester Bronchos, and Binghamton Bingoes. Although minor league records from the 1880s and 1890s are incomplete, Campau is known to have tallied at least 2,115 hits, 1,305 runs, 597 stolen bases, 157 triples, and 125 home runs in his minor league career.

References

Further reading
 
 

 
American families of French ancestry
History of Detroit